2021 Championship League may refer to:

2021 Championship League (invitational), a non-ranking snooker tournament held from January to April 2021
2021 Championship League (ranking), a ranking snooker tournament held in July and August 2021

See also 
 2021 Championship League Pool